Seán Hales (30 March 1880 – 7 December 1922) was an Irish political activist and member of Dáil Éireann from May 1921 to December 1922.

Biography
Hales was born in Ballinadee, Bandon, County Cork as John Hales, one of nine children of Robert Hales, a farmer, and Margaret ( Fitzgerald) Hales. He and his brothers (Tom, William, and Bob) were involved in the Irish Republican Army (IRA) during the Irish War of Independence.

At the 1921 elections Hales was elected to the Second Dáil as a Sinn Féin member for the Cork Mid, North, South, South East and West constituency.

At the 1922 general election, he was elected to the Third Dáil as a pro-Treaty Sinn Féin Teachta Dála (TD) for the same constituency. He received 4,374 first preference votes (7.9%). Shortly afterwards, the Irish Civil War broke out between the pro-Treaty faction, who were in favour of setting up the Irish Free State and the anti-Treaty faction, who would not accept the abolition of the Irish Republic.

On 7 December 1922, Hales was killed by anti-Treaty IRA men as he left the Dáil. Another TD, Pádraic Ó Máille, was also shot and badly wounded in the incident. His killing was in reprisal for the Free State's execution of anti-treaty prisoners. In revenge for Hales' killing, four republican leaders (Joe McKelvey, Rory O'Connor, Liam Mellows and Richard Barrett) were executed the following day, 8 December 1922.

According to information passed on to playwright Ulick O'Connor, an anti-Treaty IRA volunteer named Owen Donnelly of Glasnevin was responsible for the killing of Hales. Seán Caffrey, an anti-treaty intelligence officer told O'Connor that Donnelly had not been ordered to shoot Hales specifically but was following the general order issued by Liam Lynch to shoot TDs or senators if they could.

A commemorative statue of Hayes was unveiled at Bank Place in Bandon, in 1930.

References

1880 births
1922 deaths
Assassinated Irish politicians
Deaths by firearm in Ireland
Early Sinn Féin TDs
Irish Republican Army (1919–1922) members
Members of the 2nd Dáil
Members of the 3rd Dáil
People murdered in Ireland
People of the Irish Civil War (Pro-Treaty side)
Politicians from County Cork
People of the Irish War of Independence
1920s murders in Ireland
1922 murders in Europe
1922 crimes in Ireland